The 1988 Texas Tech Red Raiders football team represented Texas Tech University as a member of the Southwest Conference (SWC) during the 1988 NCAA Division I-A football season. In their second season under head coach Spike Dykes, the Red Raiders compiled a 5–6 record (4–3 against SWC opponents), finished in fourth place in the conference, and were outscored by opponents by a combined total of 332 to 328. The team played its home games at Clifford B. and Audrey Jones Stadium in Lubbock, Texas.

Schedule

Roster
QB Billy Joe Tolliver
DT Ronnie Gossett

References

Texas Tech
Texas Tech Red Raiders football seasons
Texas Tech Red Raiders football